"The Lavender Cowboy" was originally a 1923 humorous poem by Harold Hersey about an unmanly cowboy "with only two hairs on his chest" who comes out a hero. It was then set to music and appeared in the 1930 Western film Oklahoma Cyclone. Several versions have since been recorded, and it has been banned from radio airplay because the lyrics are considered suggestive of homosexuality.

Lavender Cowboy, The
Lavender Cowboy, The
Lavender Cowboy, The

"He was only a lavender cowboy

And the hairs on his chest were but two

He wanted to be a real hero 

And do as the real heroes do

Erbecini's and other hair lotions 

He would rub on his chest every night

But when he awoke in the morning

Not a new hair was in sight

He fought for Nellie, your honor

And he cleaned out a whole robber's nest

He died with his six guns a smokin'

But with only two hairs on his chest

Well they buried him out on the prairie

Where the coyotes howl every night

And in the place where his bones lay

Two cacti have grown into sight."

Other versions are somewhat less sympathetic to the hapless wrangler. In one, having failed to impress Nellie, he goes on a binge and breaks into the local saloon at night, "making off with the strawberry gin". This leads to his demise.

"They shot the lavender cowboy  

and said as they laid him to rest

"You're better off now boy 

coz you can't be a cowboy

with only two hairs on your chest"".